Dos Palos Oro-Loma Joint Unified  is a public school district based in Merced County, California, United States.

Notable alumni
Dave Henderson, baseball player 
Cody Martin, baseball player

References

External links
 

School districts in Merced County, California